William Wallinder (born 28 July 2002) is a Swedish ice hockey defenceman currently playing for Rögle BK of the Swedish Hockey League (SHL). He was selected 32nd overall by the Detroit Red Wings in the 2020 NHL Entry Draft.

Playing career
After four seasons within the Modo Hockey organization, Wallinder left the HockeyAllsvenskan club to sign a two-year contract with top-tier club, Rögle BK of the SHL on 20 May 2021.

Career statistics

Regular season and playoffs

International

References

External links
 

2002 births
Living people
Detroit Red Wings draft picks
Modo Hockey players
People from Sollefteå Municipality
Rögle BK players
Swedish ice hockey defencemen
Sportspeople from Västernorrland County